Thamnosophis stumpffi, commonly known as the yellow-striped water snake, is a species of snake in the subfamily Pseudoxyrhophiinae of the family Pseudoxyrhophiidae. The species is endemic to Madagascar.

Etymology
The specific name, stumpffi, is in honor of Anton Stumpff who collected the holotype.

Geographic range
T. stumpffi is found in northwestern Madagascar, including the island Nosy Be.

Habitat
The preferred natural habitat of T. stumpffi is forest.

Reproduction
T. stumpffi is oviparous.

References

Further reading
Boettger O (1881). "Diagnoses reptilium et batrachiorum novorum ab ill. Antonio Stumpff in insula Nossi-Bé Madagascariensi lectorum ". Zoologischer Anzeiger 1881: 358–362. (Dromicus stumpffi, new species, p. 358). (in Latin).
Boulenger GA (1893). Catalogue of the Snakes in the British Museum (Natural History). Volume I., Containing the Families ... Colubridæ Aglyphæ, part. London: Trustees of the British Museum (Natural History). (Taylor and Francis, printers). xiii + 448 pp. + Plates I-XXVIII. (Tropidonotus stumpffi, pp. 247–248).
Cadle JE, Ineich I (2008). "Nomenclatural status of the Malagasy snake genus Bibilava Glaw, Nagy, Franzen, and Vences, 2007: Resurrection of Thamnosophis Jan and designation of a lectotype for Leptophis lateralis Duméril, Bibron, and Duméril (Serpentes: Colubridae). Herpetological Review 39 (3): 285–288. (Thamnosophis stumpffi, new combination).
Glaw F, Nagy ZT, Franzen M, Vences M (2007). "Molecular phylogeny and systematics of the pseudoxyrhophiine snake genus Liopholidophis (Reptilia, Colubridae): evolution of its exceptional sexual dimorphism and descriptions of new taxa". Zoologica Scripta 36: 291–300. (Bibilava stumpffi, new combination).
Glaw F, Vences M (2006). A Field Guide to Amphibians and Reptiles of Madagascar, Third Edition. Cologne, Germany: Vences & Glaw Verlag. 496 pp. .

Pseudoxyrhophiidae
Snakes of Africa
Reptiles of Madagascar
Endemic fauna of Madagascar
Reptiles described in 1881